Lianna Catherine Swan, OLY (born 25 March 1997 in Awali, Bahrain) is a British-Pakistani swimmer who holds seven Pakistani national records. She specialises in breaststroke. In July/August 2014, she represented Pakistan at the 2014 Commonwealth Games in Glasgow, UK. Lianna also represented Pakistan in 2016 South Asian Games in Guwahati, India. Lianna represented Pakistan at the Rio Olympics 2016 and Tokyo Olympics 2020 in Women's 50m freestyle.

Background
Swan was born in Bahrain to a Pakistani mother, Nadia and a British father. She is a dual national of both the UK and Pakistan. She took up swimming 6 years ago when she moved to Dubai, UAE.  She completed her A-Levels in Dubai at Jumeirah College. Swan explained her decision to opt for Pakistan: "I would get a lot more out of being part of the Pakistan team because there’s a lot more people trying for the British team. The British team is really prestigious as well, but being able to swim for your country, any country, is an achievement. I think when I first started swimming for Pakistan, that was the turning point for me."

Career

National
Swan won 9 gold and 3 silver medals during the National Championships held in June 2014. This qualified her for the 2014 Commonwealth Games.

International
Swan has competed in the 2010 Asian Games; the 2011 FINA World Cup in Dubai, UAE and 2013 FINA World Aquatics Championships in Barcelona, Spain.

Swan will participate in 5 events: breaststroke - 50m & 100m; freestyle - 50m & 100m and individual medley - 200m,  at the Glasgow Games in 2014. In her first event: 50m breaststroke, she broke her own national record of 00.37.11 by swimming her heat in 00.35.72 and placing third. In the 100m freestyle event on 27 July 2014, she broke her own national record of 01:03:52 by swimming her heat in 01:03:32 and placing 6th.

In February 2016, Lianna won gold medal in the women's 200m breaststroke in 2016 South Asian Games.

National records

Freestyle
100m: 01:03:32 - Glasgow Commonwealth Games - 2014

Breaststroke
50m:  00:35:72 - Commonwealth Games, Glasgow, UK - 2014 
100m: 01:19:61 - 15th FINA World Championships, Barcelona, Spain - July 13 
200m: 02:48:86 - 12 South Asian Games - 6 Feb 2016

Individual Medley
200m: 02:32:61 - 15th FINA World Championships, Barcelona, Spain - July 13

References

External links 

 
 

1997 births
Living people
Pakistani female swimmers
British female swimmers
Swimmers at the 2014 Commonwealth Games
Commonwealth Games competitors for Pakistan
Pakistani people of British descent
Pakistani expatriate sportspeople in the United Arab Emirates
British expatriate sportspeople in the United Arab Emirates
Female breaststroke swimmers
British sportspeople of Pakistani descent
Swimmers at the 2016 Summer Olympics
Olympic swimmers of Pakistan
South Asian Games gold medalists for Pakistan
South Asian Games silver medalists for Pakistan
South Asian Games bronze medalists for Pakistan
South Asian Games medalists in swimming
Pakistani expatriate sportspeople in Bahrain
British expatriate sportspeople in Bahrain